The Caesar's Wish Stakes is a race for Thoroughbred horses held in late March at Laurel Park in Maryland, USA. The ungraded stakes race is open to three-year-old fillies, is run over one mile on the dirt, and offers a purse of $100,000. It is a minor race on the road to the Filly Triple Crown each spring. The winner of the Caesar's Wish Stakes typically races next in either the Weber City Miss Stakes (Black-Eyed Susan Stakes Trial) at Pimlico Race Course in Baltimore or the Gazelle Stakes at Aqueduct Racetrack in New York.

This race is named for Caesar's Wish (born 1975), who won 11 of her 16 starts, including the Grade I Black-Eyed Susan Stakes and the Grade I Mother Goose Stakes. She had career earnings of $314,507 and nine stakes victories. Caesar's Wish was a Maryland-bred daughter of Proudest Roman out of a mare name Primper (by Art Market). She was near the very top of her generation being named Maryland-bred Champion Filly at both age two and age three finishing in the money in 15 of 16 starts in those years. She was owned by Mrs. Sally Gibson, trained by Richard W. Small and bred by former Pimlico Race Course owners and executives Herman and Nathan Cohen. Trainer Dickie Small considered the filly as one of his greatest racing achievements, "She may not have made the most money, but she was definitely the fastest horse I've ever had." Caesar's Wish won five stakes races at age two and four stakes races at age three. After capturing the Black-Eyed Susan and the Mother Goose Stakes she attempted to seal her bid as the nation's top filly in 1978 by winning the Alabama Stakes. The chestnut filly was sent off as the odds on favorite but died of a heart attack at the top of the stretch.

The Caesar's Wish Stakes was inaugurated at the former Bowie Race Track in 1978 and was run there through 1985. The race was run at Pimlico Race Course from 1986-2004, it was not run between 2005 and 2012 when it was shifted to Laurel Park Race Course beginning in 2013.  The race has been run at three distances including it current length of one mile. From 1984-2004 the Caesar's Wish was run at its most common distance of one mile and one sixteenth and at seven furlongs between 1981-1983.

Records 
Speed record: 
  miles - 1:42 3/5 - Noblest Heart (1989)
 1 mile - 1:38.01 - Jenda's Agenda (2017)
 7 furlongs - 1:24 1/5 - Hoverclubber (1981)

Most wins by an owner:
 2- Robert Meyerhoff (DBA Fitzugh LLC in '07) (1994 &2007)

Most wins by a jockey:
 5 - Mario Pino   (1982, 1983, 1997, 1998 & 2001)

Most wins by a trainer:
 2 - Todd A. Pletcher    (1998 & 2005)
 2 - Richard W. Small    (1979 & 2004)

Winners of the Caesar's Wish Stakes since 1978

See also 
 Caesar's Wish Stakes "top three finishers" and starters
 Laurel Park Racecourse

References

External links
Laurel Park racetrack

1978 establishments in Maryland
Triple Crown Prep Races
Laurel Park Racecourse
Bowie Race Track
Horse races in Maryland
Recurring sporting events established in 1978